Panadura Royal College (also known as Royal College Panadura and Royal Maha Vidyalaya, Panadura) is a provincial school in Panadura, Sri Lanka.

School backgrounds
The school was inaugurated in 1978 as Janadipathy Vidyalaya and later renamed as Royal College Panadura. Current students of the school are referred to in the press as Panadura Royalists. The college conducts classes from grade 1 to 13 in both Sinhala and Tamil medium including English medium from grade six onwards.

The school also has a cadet corps.

Annual Big Match

Royal College Panadura plays annual cricket Big Match with St. John's College Panadura (Royal Panadura versus St. John's Panadura). It is also called Battle of the Greens. The Big Match is played for Mervyn Joseph Cooray Shield.

Alumni associations
Panadura Royal College has two main alumni associations. These alumni associations play annual cricket matches against other alumni associations such as the Old Wesleyites Sports Club and the Old Johnians Old Boys Association.

Notable alumni

See also
 List of schools in Western Province, Sri Lanka

References

1976 establishments in Sri Lanka
Boarding schools in Sri Lanka
Boys' schools in Sri Lanka
Educational institutions established in 1976
Provincial schools in Sri Lanka
Schools in Panadura